Austin Patrick King (born April 11, 1981) is an American assistant offensive line coach for the Denver Broncos of the National Football League. Prior to his coaching career, he was a center in the NFL.

Playing career

The Tampa Bay Buccaneers selected him the fourth round of the 2003 NFL Draft. Following his rookie season, he played the majority of his career with the Atlanta Falcons.

Coaching career
After beginning at Toledo as a quality control coach and working his way up to offensive coordinator at Dayton where he led a record setting offense in 2019, he was hired as a quality control coach by the Raiders on February 5, 2020. In February 2021, he was promoted to tight ends coach. He was not retained by new Raiders head coach Josh McDaniels and was hired to be the assistant offensive line coach under new Chicago Bears head coach Matt Eberflus on February 7, 2022.

References

External links

1981 births
Living people
Players of American football from Cincinnati
American football centers
Atlanta Falcons players
Tampa Bay Buccaneers players
Seattle Seahawks players
Northwestern Wildcats football players
Toledo Rockets football coaches
Syracuse Orange football coaches
Dayton Flyers football coaches
Las Vegas Raiders coaches
Chicago Bears coaches